This is a list of Ivory Coast women's international footballers who have played for the Ivory Coast women's national football team.

Players

See also 
 Ivory Coast women's national football team

References 

 
International footballers
International footballers
Ivory Coast
Football in Ivory Coast
Association football player non-biographical articles
Footballers